Office of the Waqf Administrator is a Bangladesh government regulatory agency under the Ministry of Religious Affairs responsible for administration of Waqf properties. According to Islamic, individuals can permanently donate movable or immovable property to charity and it is the responsibility to manage the Waqf and ensure its run according to the wish of the donor.

History
In 1986, the Bangladesh Bureau of Statistics calculated that there were 150,593 Waqfs in Bangladesh. The government of Bangladesh established the Office of the Waqf Administrator to manage those properties. It replaced a smaller organization formed in 1962 by the Waqfs Ordinance. The administrator is responsible for managing 70,955 acres but it faces difficulty due to shortages in funding and personnel. On 6 November 2017, the Anti-Corruption Commission arrested an officer of the Office of the Administrator of Waqfs while he was taking 50,000 bribe.

References

1988 establishments in Bangladesh
Organisations based in Dhaka
Government agencies of Bangladesh
Government departments of Bangladesh